Knebel is a village in Syddjurs Municipality, Denmark.

Poskær Stenhus, the largest round barrow in Denmark, is located 1 km east of the village.

References

Villages in Denmark
Cities and towns in the Central Denmark Region
Syddjurs Municipality